A powerboat is another name for a motorboat. Powerboat may also refer to:

 Powerboating
 F1 Powerboat World Championship
 Offshore powerboat racing